Naval Medical Research Unit Four (NAMRU-4) was a research laboratory of the US Navy which was commissioned 31 May 1946 at the Naval Hospital in Dublin, Georgia as the Mcintire
Research Unit for Rheumatic Fever, which was named for the Surgeon General of the United States Navy Ross T. Mcintire. Initial staffing was 4 physicians, 4 laboratory technicians and 4 laboratory helpers under the command of LCDR John R. Seal. Eighteen months after commissioning the Navy transferred Dublin Naval Hospital to the Veterans Affairs system and the Secretary of the Navy re-established NAMRU-4 at Great Lakes Naval Base on the grounds of the Naval Hospital to study acute respiratory diseases in military personnel with a focus on their prevention. Lieutenant Commander Seal remained the Officer in Charge. The location at Great Lakes made it ideal as this was a large recruit training command with members arriving from all over the United States and being housed in military barracks and therefore would be expected to experience outbreaks of respiratory illness periodically. Diseases studied included:
Neisseria meningitidis
Adenoviruses
Influenza
Mycoplasma
Streptococcus and rheumatic fever
In 1954 NAMRU-4 would be the first microbiology lab to ever isolate influenza virus in tissue culture. In the same year they would be the first lab to ever identify influenza B virus.
NAMRU-4 was disestablished in 1974.

Officers in Charge
Lieutenant Commander J.R. Seal MC, USN 1946-48 (McIntire Research Unit)
Commander J.R. Seal MC, USN 1948-54 (NAMRU-4)
Captain K.H. Sessions MC, USN 1954-5
Captain M.J. Hantover MC, USN 1955-7
Commander B.F. Gundlefinger MC, USN 1957-8
Captain L.F. Miller MC, USN 1958-1964
Commander C.H. Miller MC, USN 1964-1964
Captain R O Peckinpaugh MC, USN 1964-1968

Commanding officers
Captain R O Peckinpaugh MC, USN 1968-1972
Captain C.H. Miller MC, USN 1972-1974

References 
Navy Research timeline

Naval Medical Research Unit No 4. History and accomplishments: an introduction to NAMRU-4. Great Lakes, IL: Naval Medical Research Unit No. 4; 1972.

Epidemiology and Prevention of Acute Respiratory Disease in Naval Recruits

[ajph.aphapublications.org/cgi/reprint/55/1/67.pdf AN EPIDEMIOLOGIC STUDY OF RESPIRATORY ILLNESS PATTERNS
IN NAVY AND MARINE CORPS RECRUITS]

FIELD TRIAL OF THE EFFICACY OF A PREVIOUSLY PROPOSED REGIMEN USING MINOCYCLINE AND RIFAMPIN SEQUENTIALLY FOR THE ELIMINATION OF MENINGOCOCCI FROM HEALTHY CARRIERS

Protection of a Military Population From Rheumatic Fever

External links 
 Navy Medical Research timeline

Military medical research of the United States Navy
Medical and health organizations based in Georgia (U.S. state)